The Centre for Alternative Technology Railway is a funicular opened in May 1992 and located in the Centre for Alternative Technology, Powys, Wales.

Technical parameters
Length:  
Height:  
Gradient: 57%
Cables weigh: 
Cars: 2
Track gauge: 
Traction: Water ballast
Runs per hour: 10–12
Average speed:

References

External links

Centre for Alternative Technology website

Buildings and structures in Powys
Water-powered funicular railways
Funicular railways in Wales
5 ft 6 in gauge railways in Wales
Railway lines opened in 1992